was a member of the Japanese Communist Party.

Biography
Yoshio Shiga was born in Yamaguchi in 1901. He became involved with left-wing movements while attending Tokyo Imperial University. He was arrested in 1928 and remained in prison until 1945. He was editor of the Red Flag (Akahata and a member of the House of Representatives. During his time in the National Diet, Shiga was in favour of the Partial Nuclear Test Ban Treaty. He was also the leader of those in the JCP who supported the treaty. Because of his support for the treaty, he and Ichizo Suzuki, another member of the JCP who supported the test ban, were expelled from the party. They later established a pro-Soviet Communist Party known as the Voice of Japan. Shiga died in 1989.

Popular culture
Yoshio Shiga appears in the docu-drama Nihon no Ichiban Nagai Natsu" (“Japan’s Longest Summer”). Shiga is played by Soichiro Tahara.

Works
 Appeal to the People
 Eighteen Years in Prison (Gokuchu juhachi-nen) by Kyuichi Tokuda and Yoshio Shiga. Published by the Japanese Communist Party Party in 1948.

See also
 Japanese dissidence during the Shōwa period

Further reading

William D. Hoover (2011). Historical Dictionary of Postwar Japan. Scarecrow Pres.

References

External links

 

Japanese communists
Japanese revolutionaries
People from Yamaguchi Prefecture
University of Tokyo alumni
1901 births
1989 deaths
Japanese Communist Party politicians